George Bernard Rex Whitlock (8 September 1910 – 26 June 1982) was a British racewalker. He competed in the men's 50 kilometres walk at the 1948 Summer Olympics and the 1952 Summer Olympics.

References

External links
 

1910 births
1982 deaths
Athletes (track and field) at the 1948 Summer Olympics
Athletes (track and field) at the 1952 Summer Olympics
British male racewalkers
Olympic athletes of Great Britain
Place of birth missing